The Dragon 32 and Dragon 64 are home computers that were built in the 1980s. The Dragons are very similar to the TRS-80 Color Computer, and were produced for the European market by Dragon Data, Ltd., initially in Swansea, Wales before moving to Port Talbot, Wales (until 1984) and by Eurohard S.A. in Casar de Cáceres, Spain (from 1984 to 1987), and for the US market by Tano of New Orleans, Louisiana. The model numbers reflect the primary difference between the two machines, which have 32 and 64 kilobytes of RAM, respectively.

Product history
Dragon Data entered the market in August 1982 with the Dragon 32. The Dragon 64 followed a year later. The computers sold well initially and attracted the interest of independent software developers including Microdeal. A companion magazine, Dragon User, began publication shortly after the microcomputer's launch.

Despite this initial success, there were two technical impediments to the Dragon's acceptance. The graphics capabilities trailed behind other computers such as the ZX Spectrum and BBC Micro. This was significant for the games market. Additionally, as a cost-cutting measure, the hardware-supported text modes only included upper case characters. This restricted system's appeal to the educational market.

Dragon Data collapsed in June 1984. 
It was acquired by the Spanish company Eurohard S.A., which moved the factory from Wales to Cáceres and released the Dragon 200 (a Dragon 64 with a new case that allowed a monitor to be placed on top) and the Dragon 200-E (an enhanced Dragon 200 with both upper and lower case characters and a Spanish keyboard), but ultimately filed for bankruptcy in 1987. The remaining stock from Eurohard was purchased by a Spanish electronics hobbyist magazine and given away to those who paid for a three-year subscription, until 1992.

In the United States it was possible to purchase the Tano Dragon new in box until early 2017 from California Digital, a retailer that purchased the remaining stock.

Technical notes

Hardware and peripherals
The Dragon is built around the Motorola MC6809E processor running at 0.89 MHz. It was an advanced 8-bit CPU design, with limited 16-bit capabilities.

It was possible to increase the speed of the computer by using POKE 65495,0 which accelerated the ROM-resident BASIC interpreter, but temporarily disabled proper functioning of the cassette/printer ports. Manufacturing variances mean that not all Dragons were able to function at this higher speed, and use of this POKE could cause some units to crash or be unstable, though with no permanent damage. POKE 65494,0 returned the speed to normal. POKE 65497,0 pushed the speed yet higher but the display was lost until a slower speed was restored.

The Dragon used the SN74LS783/MC6883 Synchronous Address Multiplexer (SAM) and the MC6847 Video Display Generator (VDG). I/O was provided by two MC6821 Peripheral Interface Adapters (PIAs). Many Dragon 32s were upgraded by their owners to 64 KB of memory. A few were further expanded to 128 KB, 256 KB, or 512 KB with home-built memory controllers/memory management units (MMUs).

A broad range of peripherals exist for the Dragon 32/64, and there are add-ons such as the Dragon's Claw which give the Dragons a port that is hardware-compatible with the BBC Micro's user port, though separate software drivers for connected devices must be developed. Although neither machine has a built-in disk operating system (Compact Cassettes being the standard storage mechanism commonly used for machines of the time), DragonDOS was supplied as part of the disk controller interface from Dragon Data Ltd. The versatile external ports, including the standard RS-232 on the 64, also allows hobbyists to attach a diverse range of equipment.

The computer featured a composite monitor port as an alternative to the TV RF output which can be used to connect the Dragon 32 to most modern TVs to deliver a much better picture.

The Dragon used analogue joysticks, unlike most systems of the time which used simpler and cheaper digital systems. Other uses for the joystick ports included light pens.

Tony Clarke and Richard Wadman established the specifications for the Dragon.

The units had a robust motherboard in a spacious case, reminiscent of the BBC Micro, and so were more tolerant of aftermarket modification than some of their contemporaries, which often had their components crammed into the smallest possible space.

Video modes
The Dragon's main display mode is 'black on green' text (the black was, in actuality, a deeper, muddier green). The only graphics possible in this mode are quarter-tile block based.

It also has a selection of five high-resolution modes, named PMODEs 0–4, which alternate monochrome and four-colour in successively higher resolutions, culminating in the black-and-white 256×192 PMODE 4. Each mode has two possible colour palettes – these are rather garish and cause the system to fare poorly in visual comparisons with other home computers of the time. It is also impossible to use standard printing commands to print text in the graphical modes, causing software development difficulties.

Full-colour, scanline-based 64×192 semi-graphics modes are also possible, though their imbalanced resolution and programming difficulty (not being accessible via BASIC) meant they were not often utilised.

Disk systems
First to market was a complete disk operating system produced by Premier Microsystems, located near Croydon. The system was sold as the "Delta" disk operating system; there was a proposal for Dragon to market this as an addon. Dragon did not enter into such an agreement and instead produced the DragonDOS system. The two systems were incompatible.

Delta's lead in availability ensured that software was released in the format, whilst Dragon's "official" status ensured that it, too, gained software published in its format. This led to confusion and frustration, with customers finding they had either purchased a version incompatible with their setup, or that the software was only available for the competing standard.

System software 

The Dragon comes with a Microsoft BASIC interpreter in 16 KB of ROM. The BASIC appears to be nearly identical to Tandy Color Computer's Extended Basic with a few changes necessary to interact with the Dragon system.

In common with home computers of the time, the entire operating software was included on a ROM chip; therefore, the system starts instantly when powered up.

Some software providers also produced compilers for BASIC and other languages to produce binary (or "machine") code which would run many times faster and make better use of the small system RAM. Towards the end of its life, Dragon Data produced an assembler/disassembler/editor suite called Dream.

In addition to the DragonDOS disk operating system, the Dragon 32/64 is capable of running several others, including FLEX, and even OS-9 which brought UNIX-like multitasking to the platform. Memory-expanded and MMU-equipped Dragons are able to run OS-9 Level 2.

Games

Initially, the Dragon was reasonably well supported by the major UK software companies, with versions of popular games from other systems being ported to the Dragon. Top-selling games available for the Dragon include Arcadia (Imagine), Chuckie Egg (A&F), Manic Miner and sequel Jet Set Willy (Software Projects), Hunchback (Ocean) and Football Manager (Addictive). There were also companies that concentrated on the Dragon, such as Microdeal. Their character Cuthbert appeared in several games, with Cuthbert Goes Walkabout also being converted for Atari 8-bit and Commodore 64 systems.

Due to the limited graphics modes of the Dragon, converted games had a distinctive appearance, with colour games being usually played on a green or white background (rather than the more common black on other systems) or games with high-definition graphics having to run in black and white.

When the system was discontinued, support from software companies also effectively ended. However, Microdeal continued supporting the Dragon until January 1988. Some of their final games developed for the Dragon in 1987 such as Tanglewood and Airball were also converted for 16-bit machines such as the Atari ST and Amiga.

Differences from the TRS-80 Color Computer 
Both the Dragon and the TRS-80 Color Computer are based on a Motorola data sheet design for the MC6883 SAM (MMU) chip for memory management and peripheral control.

The systems are sufficiently similar that a significant fraction of the compiled software produced for one machine will run on the other. Software running via the built-in Basic interpreters also has a high level of compatibility, but only after they are re-tokenized, which can be achieved fairly easily by transferring via cassette tape with appropriate options.

It is possible to permanently convert a Color Computer into a Dragon by swapping the original Color Computer ROM and rewiring the keyboard cable.

The Dragon has additional circuitry to make the MC6847 VDG compatible with European 625-line television standards, rather than the US 525-line NTSC standard, and a Centronics parallel printer port not present on the TRS-80. Some models were manufactured with NTSC video for the US and Canadian markets.

Dragon 32 vs. Dragon 64
Aside from the amount of RAM, the Dragon 64 also has a functional RS-232 serial port which was not included on the Dragon 32.  A minor difference between the two Dragon models is the outer case colour; the Dragon 32 is beige and the Dragon 64 is light grey. Besides the case, branding and the Dragon 64's serial port, the two machines look the same. The Dragon 32 is upgradable to Dragon 64. In some cases, buyers of the Dragon 32 found that they actually received a Dragon 64 unit.

Reception
BYTE wrote in January 1983 that the Dragon 32 "offers more feature for the money than most of its [British] competitors", but "there's nothing exceptional about it". The review described it as a redesigned, less-expensive Color Computer with 32K RAM and better keyboard.

References

Notes

 Vander Reyden, John (1983). Dragon 32 programmer's reference guide. Beam Software/Melbourne House. .
 Smeed, D.; Sommerville, I. (1983). Inside the Dragon. Addison-Wesley.

External links

 The Dragon 32/64 Computers – at website www.6809.org.uk
 The Dragon Archive – An archive of everything related to the Dragon 32/64 and its clones and prototypes
 Dragon 32 Universe (Archived since April 25th, 2019) – A primarily games-based archive of Dragon 32 games, reviews and instructions
 A Slayed Beast - History of the Dragon Computer at dragon-archive-online.co.uk.
 The International Dragon Users Group – The Yahoo! group for Dragon Users
 Manuals of Dragon 32, Dragon 64 and DragonDOS (DOS 437 character set) at www.museo8bits.es
 Dragon Update - National Users Group Magazine Library at the Centre for Computing History
 The Dragon 32/64 Inlay Artwork and Game Archive at dragon32.co.uk - Archive of Dragon 32/64 inlay artwork and playable games

Computer-related introductions in 1982
6809-based home computers
Home computers
TRS-80 Color Computer
Dragon Data
Computers designed in the United Kingdom